Saint Silvan was a Christian martyr and a saint who lived in the fourth century. Not much is known about this Saint other than he was martyred between 300 A.D - 350 A.D. and his apparently incorrupt body is still on display 17 centuries after his death.  It appears that Silvan was very young when he was martyred, showing his devoutness to Christianity from a young age. In his tomb, an embroidered cross on the front of his garment indicating that he may have been a priest or some other cleric possibly indicating that he was a fairly high ranking in his time. 

The incorrupt body of Saint Silvan is located in the Church of Saint Blaise in Dubrovnik, Croatia. A number of Silvans have been canonized as saints, and it is unclear which Saint Silvan is entombed at the Church of Saint Blaise. Most sources claim the Saint Silvan at Dubrovnik was martyred in the 4th century — a gruesome wound on his neck suggests the manner of his martyrdom — which may indicate he was Saint Silvanus, Bishop of Emesa, Phoenicia, martyred c. 311. Other Saint Silvans died in various ways (e.g., thrown off a cliff or of natural causes) or at an age suggesting they cannot be the Saint Silvan at Dubrovnik. Still others are believed to be buried elsewhere. His body is purported to be totally incorrupt and lies in the Church of St. Blaise at Dubrovnik, Croatia. On his neck the body has a big scar, which is believed to have caused his martyrdom.

References

4th-century Christian martyrs
Incorrupt saints